Kouxian is a general Chinese term for any variety of jaw harp. The jaw harp is a plucked idiophone in which the lamella  is mounted in a small frame, and the player's open mouth serves as a resonance chamber.

Chinese jaw harps may comprise multiple idiophones that are lashed together at one end and spread in a fan formation. They may be made from bamboo or a metal alloy, such as brass. Modern kouxian with three or more idiophones might be tuned to the first few tones of the minor pentatonic scale.

The jaw harp likely originated in Asia. Although played throughout China, it is particularly popular among the non-Han ethnic groups of Southwest China, such the Yunnan, Guangxi, and Guizhou. The varieties of Chinese have numerous vernacular names for the instrument; one such name is hoho.

External links

Kate Torgovnick May (2013) "Mouth music: Wang Li at TED2013", Blog.Ted.com.
Tsioulcas, Anastasia (2012). "Wang Li: globalFEST 2012", NPR.org.

Chinese musical instruments
Heteroglot guimbardes and jaw harps

zh:口弦